The 2013–14 Pune F.C. season is the club's fifth season in I-League, the top flight of Indian football and the seventh season in the club's entire history. This season will also see the club participate in Asia's top footballing competition, the AFC Champions League, in 2014 after India was awarded a spot in the tournament qualifiers and the club were announced as the best club in India to complete the club licensing requirements set by the All India Football Federation.

Former Netherlands international player and former Vitesse Arnhem manager Mike Snoei was hired to be the head coach of the club following the resignation of Derrick Pereira.

Background

Pune began the 2012–13 campaign with hope. The club came into the season having lost some of their better players, including Subrata Pal, Baldeep Singh, and Lester Fernandez. The club also lost their top scorer from the previous season in former Guinea international Mandjou Keita. However, the club was able to make up for those loses with the signings of Abhra Mondal and James Moga. With these players added to the squad, Pune went into the 2012–13 I-League season with a bang, beating ONGC 3–2 on the opening day of the season. Then, after defeating Pailan Arrows on 9 November 2012, the club went on a nine-game unbeaten streak which eventually allowed the club to finish the season in second place, their best ever finish in the I-League to date.

Pre-season

Player movement
After the 2012–13 season ended, Pune did not make many major changes to the squad. The club did let go three of their four foreigners in Chika Wali, Boima Karpeh, and club top scorer James Moga. All three players subsequently signed for other I-League clubs with Wali signing for Salgaocar, Karpeh joining Sporting Goa, and Moga joining East Bengal. The club's number 1 goalkeeper from last season, Abhra Mondal, also left the club to join East Bengal. In addition to Mondal, the club also lost Subhash Singh, Karma Tsewang, and Nallappan Mohanraj to Shillong Lajong, Salgaocar, and Mumbai Tigers respectively. The club also lost their first ever signing in Jeje Lalpekhlua who decided to sign for former I-League champions, Dempo.

Air India forward Prakash Thorat was the first player signed by Pune for the new season. The club then proceeded to sign both Anthony D'Souza and Arup Debnath respectively from Salgaocar and Mumbai Tigers. The club then went on to sign three new foreigners to replace the three that left the club. The first to arrive was Equatorial Guinea international Raúl Fabiani. The second foreign signing for Pune came only two days later with the signing of Calum Angus from Swedish Superettan side GAIS. Then the third and final foreign signing for Pune before the season began was former A-Leaguer James Meyer who last played for the Brisbane Roar. Then, before the I-League season began, Pune signed up four players from their academy with Denechandra Meitei, Salam Ranjan Singh, Thongkhosiem Haokip, and Gobin Singh all earning promotions to the senior squad.

After the season began, Pune did make a change in their squad with Raúl Fabiani being released from the side and former Premier League and Bolton Wanderers player Riga Mustapha being brought in as a replacement. The club made further changes to their squad in January 2014 with the signings of Gabriel Fernandes, Nicolau Borges, and Nawab Zeeshan being announced. Fernandes comes on loan from Dempo while Borges comes on loan from Mohun Bagan.

Then, on 18 February 2014, the club announced that they had re-signed former Fans' Player of the Year Lester Fernandez for the rest of the season.

In

Out

Matches
The club began their pre-season campaign with new coach Mike Snoei in Goa. The club drew their first two matches against SESA Football Academy and Laxmi Prasad before beating Churchill Brothers 2–0 thanks to a double from Raúl Fabiani. In their next match, Pune defeated league-rivals Mumbai F.C. at the Balewadi Sports Complex in which strikes from James Meyer, Fabiani, and Zohmingliana Ralte earned the side a 3–0 victory. Then in their final match of pre-season, Pune defeated Deccan XI 2–0 thanks to strikes from Dhanpal Ganesh and Shanmugam Venkatesh.

Results

I-League

Summary
Pune set out for their first ever I-League title in style with a victory away from home in round one of the 2013–14 I-League season against Mohammedan. Debut goals from Raúl Fabiani, who scored a brace, and James Meyer helped Pune to 3–1 victory at the Salt Lake Stadium. Josimar was the scorer for Mohammedan. Pune then suffered a goalless draw in their second match of the season against Shillong Lajong on 29 September 2013 at the Jawaharlal Nehru Stadium.

Pune then began what would be a home-only month of October in which all their matches that month would be played at home. The first of the three matches occurred on 10 October against Mohun Bagan. Pune managed to come out on top in that match 2–0 thanks to goals from academy product Thongkhosiem Haokip and foreign import James Meyer. The second match then occurred nine-days later on 19 October against the defending champions from the 2012–13 season Churchill Brothers. Despite that fact, Pune were able to come out of the match with a victory thanks to a 52nd-minute goal from Calum Angus, his first for the club. Then, the third and final match of the month came on 27 October against newly promoted Rangdajied United in which a 29th-minute goal from Angus lead Pune to a 1–0 victory. The victory was important for Pune as it meant that Pune went into November tied for first place in the I-League with Salgaocar

Despite their grand October form, Pune could not stop themselves from falling 2–0 to Sporting Goa on 2 November. Goals from Victorino Fernandes and Pratesh Shirodkar sealed Pune's fate. However, Pune managed to come back in their very next match against new direct-entry side Bengaluru FC at home on 6 November in which a goal from James Meyer lead Pune to a 1–0 victory. Then, after a two-week international break, Pune returned to Goa to take on Salgaocar in a top of the table match as the winner would take first place in the league. After going down a goal in the fourth minute from Darryl Duffy, Pune managed to equalize through a Riga Mustapha penalty, his first goal for the club, in the 61st minute. Five days later, Pune returned to the same venue to this time take on Dempo. After going down early once again to a Beto 47th-minute goal it was again Riga Mustapha who came through for Pune with his 51st-minute goal earning Pune a 1–1 draw.

The club then began the month of December with a home match against United on 1 December 2013. After taking the lead in the 77th minute through academy product Nikhil Kadam, United scored their equalizer seven minutes later to force Pune to begin the month with a 1–1 draw. The month then did not get better for Pune as they succumbed to their second defeat of the season at home to arch-rivals Mumbai on 7 December 2013. After going down early to a goal from former India international Pappachen Pradeep, Pune equalized through current India international Arata Izumi in the 41st minute. However, Mumbai scored the winning goal in the 60th minute through Yusif Yakubu. The club then fell to their second defeat in a row in their next match against Rangdajied United at the Nehru Stadium in which, after taking a halftime 2–0 lead through Riga Mustapha and Gurjinder Kumar, the club gave away three second half goals (including two in stoppage time) to lose 3–2. However the club then returned to winning ways when they faced United for the second time that month at the Kalyani Stadium on 15 December 2013. An early brace from Riga Mustapha helped Pune to a 2–1 victory. But that was only a short-lived moment for the club as the side quickly fell to third loss of the season in their next match against Mohun Bagan on 21 December 2013. A brace from Odafe Onyeka Okolie and a goal from Ram Malik saw Pune lose 3–1 with the only Pune goal coming from Academy product Thongkhosiem Haokip.

Once the league restarted for Pune in February 2014, the club first took on Sporting Goa at home on 16 February 2014. After going down early in the 39th minute through Beevan D'Mello goal, Pune managed to equalize in the 56th minute through Thongkhosiem Haokip as Pune drew 1–1. Pune then won their first match of the year only three days later on the 19th against Mohammedan at the Balewadi Sports Complex when they defeated the Kolkata club 2–0. The goals came from Thongkhosiem Haokip and Gabriel Fernandes.

Matches

Table

Results summary

Results by round

Federation Cup

On 29 August 2013 it was announced by the All India Football Federation that the format for the 2013–14 Indian Federation Cup would be the same as in past years. Also at that meeting, it was announced that Pune had been placed in Group A with Churchill Brothers and United with another team to be decided. Then on 28 October 2013 it was announced that the fourth and final team to be placed in Group A would be I-League 2nd Division regulars, Langsning. Matches for the group stage and final rounds were also released around that time. However, on 13 December 2013, it was announced that Langsning had withdrawn from the Federation Cup, meaning that Eagles would replace them.

Pune began their Federation Cup campaign on 14 January 2014 against Eagles at the Jawaharlal Nehru Stadium in Kochi. Despite taking the lead first through Riga Mustapha in the 55th minute, Eagles managed to equalize through Koko Sakibo to draw the match 1–1. Three days later, Pune suffered their first loss of the tournament when they were defeated by United 1–0 through a goal from former Pune player Baldeep Singh.

Then, three days after that, Pune were officially out of the Federation Cup after a 3–2 defeat against eventual champions Churchill Brothers. Pune went down early in the match through an eighth-minute goal from Anthony Wolfe before equalizing through Gabriel Fernandes in the 19th. Lenny Rodrigues then scored for Churchill Brothers to make the score 2–1 before Pune equalized again through Gabriel Fernandes in the 53rd minute. However, Churchill Brothers then scored the winner in the 74th minute through a second Anthony Wolfe goal.

Table

Matches

Durand Cup

For the fifth time in their history, Pune entered the Durand Cup as their opening tournament of the season. On 7 September 2013 it was announced by the club that they would send a mainly academy squad mixed with four senior players; Caitano Costa, Prakash Thorat, Shahinlal Meloly, and Gobin Singh. It was also announced that Naushad Moosa would coach the side during the tournament.

The tournament would turn out to be a short-lived one for the young Pune squad as the team lost both of their two group stage matches, thus ending them in last place in their group. The first loss came against Army Red on 9 September 2013 in which goals from Vipin TV and Lallidianmawia meant that Pune lost 2–0. Then their second loss came four days later against former I-League club ONGC F.C. in which a quick double from Henry Ezeh and an own goal from Hassan Odeola left Pune FC with a 2–1 loss.

Squad

Table

Matches

Stats

AFC Champions League

On 26 November 2013 it was announced by the Asian Football Confederation that India would be awarded 1 spot in the AFC Champions League, Asia's top footballing competition, for 2014 and that Pune would be the representatives for the club in the competition. It was also announced by the AFC that Pune would first have to play in a qualifier in order to make the Champions League group stage proper.

On 10 December 2013, during the AFC Champions League draw, it was announced that Pune would first play in the first round of qualifiers in the East Zone against Hanoi T&T of the V.League 1. They took on the Vietnamese club on 29 January 2014 at the Balewadi Sports Complex in which they were defeated 3–0 by the visitors and thus knocked-out of the AFC Champions League and relegated to the AFC Cup.

Qualifiers

AFC Cup

Group stage

Player information

Squad information
Updated 18 February 2014.

Management

As of October 2013.

Player statistics

Appearances and goals

 ONL = Out on loan.
 L = Has left the club during the season.

Top scorers

International Caps
Players called for senior international duty during the 2013–14 season while under contract with Pune.

See also
 2013–14 in Indian football
 Pune F.C.

References

Pune
Pune FC seasons